The list of shipwrecks in July 1854 includes ships sunk, wrecked, grounded, or otherwise lost during July 1854.

1 July

2 July

3 July

4 July

5 July

6 July

8 July

9 July

10 July

11 July

12 July

13 July

15 July

16 July

17 July

19 July

20 July

21 July

22 July

23 July

24 July

25 July

26 July

27 July
For the beaching of Charles Humberston'' on this date, see the entry for 3 March 1854

28 July

29 July

30 July

31 July

Unknown date

References

1854-07